You're the One is a 2000 Spanish film directed by José Luis Garci. It was Spain's submission to the 73rd Academy Awards for the Academy Award for Best Foreign Language Film, but was not accepted as a nominee.

Cast
 Lydia Bosch - Julia
 Julia Gutiérrez Caba - tía Gala
 Juan Diego - don Matías
 Ana Fernández - Pilara
 Manuel Lozano - Juanito
 Iñaki Miramón - Orfeo
 Fernando Guillén - Padre de Julia
 Marisa de Leza - Madre de Julia
 Carlos Hipólito - Fidel
 Jesús Puente - doctor Bermann

Plot
Julia, an only child of an affluent, bank owning family living in Madrid, escapes from her family to get over her grief that her boyfriend has been imprisoned. Julia is a well-educated woman, having studied in Switzerland and England, who wants to become a writer.  Julia drives to a little village in Asturias called "Corralbos del Sella" and there she stays in a mansion "llendelabarca" of an old childhood friend "Pilara" she had spent many a happy summer with.  Also living there is Pilara's mother in law Tia Gala, and her grandson Juanito.

Julia's relationship with caretakers, teacher and priest makes Julia, a woman of the Spanish capital, perhaps for the first time to not feel so alone.

Awards
 51st Berlin International Film Festival (2001) Silver Bear for outstanding artistic contribution.

See also
 Cinema of Spain
 List of submissions to the 73rd Academy Awards for Best Foreign Language Film

References

External links
 

2000 films
Films featuring a Best Supporting Actress Goya Award-winning performance
Spanish romantic drama films
Films with screenplays by José Luis Garci
Silver Bear for outstanding artistic contribution
Films directed by José Luis Garci
2000s Spanish films